The Pedestrian Accessibility and Movement Environment Laboratory (PAMELA) is a research facility located at University College London in the United Kingdom. It's designed to study human interactions in controlled conditions by replicating real-world environments such as urban streets and public parks. The laboratory has an  artificial pavement platform which is used to simulate everyday scenarios, from different types of pedestrians to varying pavement conditions. Its experiments are intended to create safer streets and more user-friendly public spaces.

See also
 Safety engineering
 NIST stone test wall

External links

References

Pedestrian infrastructure in the United Kingdom
University College London